Katherine Marie Beck (September 4, 1982 – December 30, 2006) was an American curler from Omaha, Nebraska. She was a three-time World Junior Curling Championships medalist, including a gold medal in 2002.

Curling career
Beck began curling in 1992 at the age of ten. She competed in her first national championship at the 2000 Junior Nationals, playing third for skip Pam Montbach. They earned the silver medal, losing to Laura Delaney's team in the final. The next year Beck returned to Junior Nationals with the same team, swapping positions with Montbach, but settled for sixth place in the end.

For the 2001–02 season Beck played second with the Johnson sisters, Cassie and Jamie, and Maureen Brunt. The team was named United States Curling Association's Team of the Year for 2002. The next year Jamie aged out of juniors so became the teams coach for Junior Nationals, with Beck moving to third and Rebecca Dobie joining the team at second. The Johnson team defended their title, when the US Junior Nationals for a second year in a row. At the  they again made it to the final, but settled for the silver medal when they lost to Canada's Marliese Miller. They also competed at the 2003 United States Women's Championship, Beck's first, making it to the semifinals before getting knocked out by Patti Lank, the defending champion.

Aged out of juniors, the team maintained the same line-up for the 2003–04 season. They again made it to the semifinals of Women's Nationals and again got knocked out by the defending champions, this time Debbie McCormick. In the 2004–05 season Beck played as alternate for Caitlin Maroldo's team at the National Championship, which was also the Olympic Trials for the 2006 Winter Olympics. They finished in seventh place.

Personal life
Beck grew up in Omaha, Nebraska and started curling because of her parents. She attended the University of Minnesota, graduating with a Bachelor of Individualized Studies degree.

In 2005 Beck was diagnosed with Ewing's sarcoma and she died on December 30, 2006.

After her death, the Katie Beck Memorial Award was created in honor of Beck and is given annually to junior curlers that show "coachability, good sportsmanship, a positive attitude, and a commitment to competitive junior curling".

Teams

References

External links
 

1982 births
2006 deaths
American female curlers
Sportspeople from Omaha, Nebraska
University of Minnesota alumni
People from Carroll County, Iowa
Sportspeople from Iowa
20th-century American women
20th-century American people
21st-century American women